Jeffrey Marsh (born July 7, 1977) is an American writer, actor, artist, activist, and social media personality, best known for making viral videos on Vine, Instagram, and TikTok. Marsh identifies as non-binary and addresses a variety of topics through their content, including LGBT+ issues, mental health and personal development.

Early life and education
Marsh was born in York, Pennsylvania, and grew up on a farm nearby. Marsh often spoken about having felt misunderstood during a self-identified rough childhood.

Marsh attended college at the University of the Arts in Philadelphia and earned a BFA in Musical Theater, later moving to New York City to pursue a career in cabaret performance before becoming an internet celebrity and leader in the LGBTIQ community.

Career

Live performance and cabaret 
While living in Philadelphia after college, Marsh was a local performance artist, hosting a weekly cabaret at L'Etage produced by Robert Drake of WXPN public radio. Marsh's show, An Evening With Jeffrey Marsh, was one of the founding performances of the Philadelphia Gay & Lesbian Theater Festival.

After moving to New York City in 2007, Marsh began performing as part of the downtown cabaret scene. Marsh appeared at popular venues including Joe's Pub and Don't Tell Mama. At Dixon Place, they starred in "Julian," a 2010 musical based on the life of Vaudeville performer Julian Eltinge. In 2012, Marsh was commissioned to create a performance art piece honoring Richard Simmons at the Museum of Art and Design.

Social media 
Marsh's Vines usually feature an affirming or empowering statement delivered directly to the camera, or a song, joke, or dance. Their most popular Vine to date, with over 26 million loops, shows Marsh saying, "I can predict the future, and you're going to be ok." It is the Vine that Bustle claims "broke Tumblr with its greatness."

Mashable was the first mainstream media outlet to label Marsh the Internet's "anti-bully." The Huffington Post has said of Marsh: "In the technological age, the face of activism has evolved along with the way in which we communicate. Marsh is part of a generation of LGBTQ activists who, through social media, are changing minds and perceptions in parts of the world where people may not encounter a queer person in their day to day lives." Digg described Marsh's overall message as, "Be yourself. Be happy with yourself. Be more comfortable with your differences — and embrace and enjoy them."

Marsh is the official social media ambassador and red carpet correspondent for the Gay, Lesbian, and Straight Education Network (GLSEN), working closely with the organization on their #BeYourSelfie campaign. Marsh interviewed several celebrities, including Zachary Quinto and J.J. Abrams, on the red carpet at the 2015 GLSEN Respect Awards.

Marsh created a vine for GLAAD's #LoveWins campaign (celebrating marriage equality) and helped create the #GotYourBack campaign with the media awareness group's staff. Marsh has also worked with The Trevor Project to prevent teen suicide, through their #HeartYourself hashtag campaign.

Marsh also created the #NoTimeToHate myself and #DontSayThatsSoGay campaigns on Vine to combat homophobia and bring awareness to genderqueer identity.

About Vine, Marsh told Digg, "I make Vines as a time machine, I'm making them for my 10-year-old self back in Pennsylvania on the farm. Which, as I've come to find out, there are a lot of 10-year-old 'me's' around. [My Vines] are a way to bring healing to everybody, including me." One of Marsh's Vines was chosen #5 in BuzzFeed's list of the top Vines of 2014. It depicts Marsh saying, "Don't forget: you have as much of a right to be here as anyone else." Because of their viral popularity, they were awarded the title "Vine's Transgender Superheroine" by Digg.

In 2016, CBS described Marsh as "the internet's most beloved anti-bully."

Print and other media 
Marsh is a regular contributor to The Huffington Post, where he has also been interviewed.

In August 2016, Marsh released their first book, How to Be You, via Penguin Random House. The book is Marsh's own story of "growing up fabulous in a small farming town," and also serves as a workbook, inviting readers to participate in activities and answer questions about how they do the things they do. NBC News describes the book as "Part memoir, part self-help, but also a workbook," and "'a love letter' to Marsh's 11-year-old self." Marsh said in an interview with Digital Journal that the book is influenced by their practice of Buddhism.

In conjunction with the release of the book How to Be You, they also became a regular contributing writer for Time magazine and Oprah.com.

After The New York Times tweeted a cartoon portraying presidents Donald Trump and Vladimir Putin as a gay lovers, Marsh said "There seems to be no greater insult than comparing someone to a queer. For an LGBTQ youth, it's not background noise. When it comes up on their feed it feels like a direct personal attack, and to have a group that's as well-established as the New York Times personally attacking you feels horrendous."

Criticism 
Marsh's videos have on several occasions been criticized for targeting children, and offering minors advise on topics such as "how to go no-contact" with their parents. 

In 2023, Shumirun Nessa - a UK-based TikToker - published a video calling on Marsh to “stop telling kids to go on your Patreon and chat to you privately without their parents knowing”. Nessa claims that due to this she and her children were doxxed by Marsh's followers and that her car had been vandalised.

Personal life
Marsh is non-binary and uses they as a pronoun and "Mx." as a gender neutral title. Marsh has also identified at various times as a gay man, queer, genderqueer, and genderfluid.

Marsh is a Buddhist.

See also 
 Queery
 Media portrayal of LGBT people

References 

LGBT people from New York (state)
1977 births
Living people
LGBT people from Pennsylvania
American non-binary writers
American non-binary actors
Non-binary artists
Non-binary activists
LGBT YouTubers
Genderfluid people